St. Petersburg College (SPC) is a public college in Pinellas County, Florida. It is part of the Florida College System and one of the institutions in the system designated a "state college," as it offers a greater number of bachelor's degrees than traditional community colleges focused on associate degrees. It is accredited by the Southern Association of Colleges and Schools and enrolled about 29,000 students in the fall of 2018.

The school was founded in 1927 as a private junior college, the first in Florida. It later became a public institution and grew to include campuses throughout Pinellas County. Today it has eleven campuses and centers: four in St. Petersburg, Florida and seven in Seminole, Pinellas Park, Largo, Clearwater, and Tarpon Springs.

History 

St. Petersburg College was founded in 1927 as St. Petersburg Junior College by Captain George M. Lynch, Pinellas County's city superintendent of schools for the city of St. Petersburg, as a private, non-profit institution. It was created in part because of the economic downturn preceding the Great Depression as a way for local students to receive a postsecondary education without having to relocate or pay high tuition. On opening day, the college consisted of 102 students and 14 faculty members, operating from an unused wing of St. Petersburg High School. After one semester, SPJC moved its operations to a former high school facility overlooking Mirror Lake, where it remained until January 1942. At this point, the facility was moved into a single building on the corner of 5th Ave. N. and 66th St. N.—a building still in active use today as the James E. Hendry Administration Building, part of the St. Petersburg/Gibbs Campus.

SPJC became a public college in 1948.

After a 1959 study clearly illustrated the demand for a higher-education facility in northern Pinellas county, SPJC began planning the development of a second campus located in Clearwater, Florida. In 1962, the college acquired  of land in the vicinity of Drew Street and County Road 32 (Old Coachman Road), land which previously contained an orange grove and a waste disposal site. Construction began on February 25, 1964. That same year, the new campus, consisting of only five buildings, was officially dedicated on November 21.

Like almost all other Florida colleges, SPJC was all-white until the mid-1960s. A companion junior college for black students, Gibbs Junior College, opened its doors in 1957. Gibbs was placed under the supervision of SPJC in 1965, and became the Gibbs campus of SPJC. In 1966-67 the name was changed to the Skyway Campus of SPJC. It ceased operations in 1967. The only association of today's (2016) Gibbs Campus of SPC with the former Gibbs Junior College is nominal; it is not located where the college was.

Campuses 
St. Petersburg College has no resident students. This is mostly because no single campus is large enough to warrant a need for student on-campus housing. Many of the SPC campuses do not offer a large curriculum of available courses, but instead specialize in one or two specific fields. For example, the Caruth Health Education Center in Pinellas Park specializes in courses centering on health care, while the Seminole campus is a highly technology-oriented campus. The Seminole campus also serves to house SPC's University Partnership Center, a campus that offers select degree programs from 16 fully accredited institutions, including Barry University, Case Western Reserve University's Francis Payne Bolton School of Nursing, Cleveland State University, Eckerd College, Embry-Riddle Aeronautical University, Florida Gulf Coast University, Florida Institute of Technology, Florida International University, Florida State University, Indiana University, Saint Leo University, University of Central Florida, University of West Florida, University of Florida, and University of South Florida. In total, SPC's University Partnership program offers 60 bachelor's degrees and 39 graduate degrees.

Both the Student Services building on the St Petersburg/Gibbs Campus and the Natural Science, Mathematics and College of Education Building on the Clearwater Campus were both recently awarded LEED Gold Certification. The two buildings mark the first LEED Gold higher education buildings in Pinellas County.

Libraries 
St. Petersburg College has eight campus libraries, as well as an extensive online library. The eight campus libraries include the Allstate Center Library, Clearwater Campus Library, SPC Downtown Library, SPC Midtown Library, West St. Petersburg Community Library at St. Petersburg Gibbs Campus, Health Education Center Library, Seminole Community Library at Seminole Campus, and the Tarpon Springs Campus Library. The St. Petersburg/Gibbs, Clearwater, and Seminole campus libraries are joint-use libraries, giving users the benefits of a public library and a college library in one. The collections include print and electronic books, academic journals, magazines and newspapers, thousands of online research databases, streaming videos, audiobooks, images, citation tools, music, and periodicals. Study areas, computer labs, and printing services are also available. In addition to on site reference librarians, students can use digital reference services such as AskALibrarian, where they can chat, email or text with an SPC librarian.

Athletics
The St. Petersburg College athletic teams go by the name "Titans." They are a member of the National Junior College Athletic Association (NJCAA) and compete in the Suncoast Conference of the Florida State College Activities Association (FSCAA). The Titans are represented by a men's basketball and baseball team, as well as a women's volleyball, basketball, tennis, and softball team. The college also has a cheerleading squad who cheers for the men's and women's basketball teams. Cheerleading is also present at pep rallies and other school functions. The Titans softball team appeared in the first Women's College World Series in 1969.

Notable alumni 

Notable alumni include Gus Bilirakis, the current U.S. representative from Florida's 9th District; Henry Lyons, the former president of the National Baptist Convention; Jim King, the former president of the Florida Senate; Frank Wren, the former general manager of the Atlanta Braves; Carl M. Kuttler Jr., the former president of St. Petersburg College; Bob Carroll the writer and creator of the I Love Lucy television show; Nicole P. Stott, NASA astronaut; and James F. Sirmons, broadcast pioneer and CBS executive.
Jim Morrison of the Doors attended SPC briefly.

Partnerships 
St. Petersburg College is partnered with the Multijurisdictional Counterdrug Task Force Training (MCTFT) and the Florida Army National Guard in counter-drug efforts. In partnership with St. Petersburg College, the MCTFT provides unique, tuition-free military and counter-drug training for local, state, federal, and military criminal justice professionals as well as awareness training for community leaders.

St. Petersburg College is also partnered with the Combating Transnational Organized Crime (CTOC) Center of Excellence (COE). The CTOC COE provides unique, tuition-free CTOC training in support of Department of Defense strategies. The CTOC COE has campuses on Camp Blanding Joint Training Center near Starke, Florida, at St. Petersburg College in St. Petersburg, Florida, and on Camp Murray near Tacoma, Washington.

References

External links 
 

 
Education in St. Petersburg, Florida
Educational institutions established in 1927
Florida College System
Universities and colleges accredited by the Southern Association of Colleges and Schools
Tourist attractions in St. Petersburg, Florida
NJCAA athletics
1927 establishments in Florida